Tahoe Pines is an unincorporated community in Placer County, California. It lies at an elevation of 6230 feet (1899 m).

The settlement was established in 1909. The Tahoe Pines post office operated from 1912 to 1959.

References

Lake Tahoe
Unincorporated communities in Placer County, California
Populated places established in 1909
1909 establishments in California
Unincorporated communities in California